Trompe le Monde is the fourth studio album by the American alternative rock band Pixies, released on September 23, 1991 on 4AD in the United Kingdom and on September 24, 1991, on  Elektra Records in the United States. Recorded in Burbank, California, Paris and London, the album was produced by Gil Norton, and was Pixies' final studio album before their subsequent break-up two years later. Trompe le Monde is the last album to feature founding bass guitarist Kim Deal.

Composition
"Head On" is a cover of the Jesus and Mary Chain track. It was released as a single and reached number 6 on the Billboard Modern Rock Tracks chart in the U.S. 

"U-Mass" is a song about the University of Massachusetts Amherst, where Black Francis met Joey Santiago before dropping out to form Pixies. In a 2001 interview, Santiago recalled that the original guitar riff was written while they were still enrolled at the school.

Artwork and packaging
The album name comes from the title of the first track, "Trompe le Monde", a French phrase meaning "Fool the World". Unlike previous albums, the title of the album comes from the name of a song (rather than a song lyric), and is a play on the French phrase "Trompe-l'œil", a painting technique in which the painter fools the viewer into thinking objects presented are real. On some versions of the CD, the title is erroneously printed as Tromp le Monde on the disc itself.

Critical reception 

Michael Bonner of Lime Lizard described Trompe le Monde as "one of the best albums that you may very well ever hear" and "a strong contender for best album of the 20th century". 

In a retrospective review, AllMusic writer Heather Phares noted the reduced role of Kim Deal, calling it "essentially Black Francis' solo debut". Tom Ewing of Freaky Trigger named Trompe le Monde his ninth favorite album of the 1990s, describing it as "clean-lined sci-fi popmetal, perpetually underrated."

Track listing

Personnel 

Pixies
 Black Francis – vocals, guitar
 Kim Deal – bass guitar, vocals
 David Lovering – drums
 Joey Santiago – lead guitar

Additional musicians
 Eric Drew Feldman – keyboards, synthetics
 Jef Feldman – tabla, doumbek ("Space (I Believe in)", "Lovely Day")

Technical
 Gil Norton – producer
 Steven Haigler – engineer 
 Andrew Ballard – assistant engineer
 John McDonnell – assistant engineer
 Ken Gardner – assistant engineer
 Scott Blockland – assistant engineer
 Philipe Tousche – assistant engineer
 Vaughan Oliver / v23 – art direction, design
 Chris Bigg – design assistance
 Paul McMenamin – design assistance
 Simon Larbalestier – photography
 Steven Appleby – artwork (rockets)
 TPP Ltd. London – typesetting

Charts

Certifications and sales

References

 Frank, Josh; Ganz, Caryn. Fool the World: The Oral History of a Band Called Pixies. Virgin Books, 2005. .

External links 
 [ Allmusic: Trompe le Monde]

1991 albums
4AD albums
Albums produced by Gil Norton
Elektra Records albums
Pixies (band) albums